Alien Breed 3D II: The Killing Grounds is a first-person shooter, the fifth game in the Alien Breed franchise, a series of science fiction-themed shooters by Team17. It was published in 1996 by Ocean Software.

Team17 had originally intended this to be its final Amiga title. Following the success of Worms, Team17's first multi-format release, the company was looking to get out of the Amiga game market, which had become stagnant over the years. As it transpired, The Killing Grounds was not Team17's final Amiga titleWorms: The Director's Cut was released the following year.

Team17 made the game's source code freely available in March 1997, on the cover CD of Amiga Format magazine issue 95.

Gameplay 
With the success of Alien Breed 3D, Team17 decided to follow it up with a sequel. This time Team17 was aiming even higher, hoping to recreate something similar to the Quake engine on an Amiga. Team17 had included two versions of the game spread over 5 disks: one with high-quality sound and textures, the other with reduced quality versions. The reduced version was supposedly able to run on a non-expanded Amiga 1200, although the game ran slowly.

Their project, however, was perhaps over-ambitious. Most Amigas of the time struggled to run the game, even with upgraded RAM and accelerator cards. Even with the fastest CPU at that time (MC68060 @ 66 MHz), the game could not be played smoothly with high details in fullscreen. Most Amiga enthusiasts have only been able to play the game in recent years using emulation.

An editor was shipped with the game, allowing users to create their own levels.

Reception

Alien Breed 2D II: The Killing Grounds received mostly favorable reviews. Critics were divided on the appropriateness of the hardware requirements and the enemy artificial intelligence, but were united in their judgement that the 2 MB version ran smoothly but with rudimentary graphics and that the 4 MB version required an Amiga computer with heavily accelerated graphics. CU Amiga justified the requirements by pointing out that Team17 intended to create a definitive Doom-clone for Amiga and noting that Worms: The Director's Cut, another video game of Team17, required an AGA chipset. The magazine praised the level layout and acclaimed the artificial intelligence, the latter of which had given the enemies "a sense of menace ... that has not been matched" by the enemies of the game's Amiga competitors. The enemies have been described as erratic and unwilling to die, and the level layout is said to emphasise the need to conserve ammunition and health for later levels and battles. One of the most enthusiastic reviews came from Amiga Format. It praised the lighting and sound effects, the weapon variety, the automap, the enemy artificial intelligence, the level editor, and the challenge and difficulty curve the game presented. It asserted that the enemies had to be disabled for multiplayer mode because of the limitations on data transfer between Amiga 1200 machines, and its only criticisms focused on some of the sound effects and the fact that the player's weapons tend to be aimed towards ground enemies instead of those hovering above them. It favorably compared the game's quality to Doom II and Quake as an Amiga alternative designed for much less expensive computers.

Amiga Action took issue with the game's hardware requirements and the fact that both 2- and 4 MB versions suffered severe technical drawbacks. The magazine found that the 4 MB version was playable only when the screen size was scaled down to half and the lighting setting turned off, even on a 68060-powered Amiga with six megabytes. However, the 2 MB version, which the magazine found to have a much smoother performance, would run at the lowest possible screen resolution, and lacked lighting effects, and the built-in level editor only worked on Amiga machines with at least four megabytes. It also noted the artificial intelligence's flaws such as not being able to open doors. Amiga Power was more critical. Although it appeared to score the game an exceptionally high 98%, the actual scores for 2- and 4 MB versions ranged in the fifties, and the fake score was notably added to fool readers who skip straight to the bottom lines of the magazine's reviews. It similarly criticised the stiff hardware requirements, noting the lack of floor and ceiling textures in the 2 MB version means that the player sometimes cannot discern floor elevation and will thus unwittingly fall off ledges. The magazine went further to question the developer's design choices and the overall gameplay. It wrote that the enemies would occasionally alternate between attacking the player and seemingly "los[ing] interest and wanter[ing] away," and the player could run through them without trouble when cornered. It contrasted the game's pacing from that of the first Alien Breed 3D in that it is impossible to progress in certain situations without a certain amount of health before grabbing the next medikit, which is further complicated by the game saves occurring only between levels. The magazine wrote it felt that Team17 had not adequately playtested the game and called the game's deathmatch-only multiplayer mode a "waste of time" before concluding that Alien Breed 3D II: The Killing Grounds was "a comprehensive disappointment".

Cancelled sequel  
A PC/Dreamcast follow-up to The Killing Grounds, entitled Alien Breed: Conflict, began development in 1999. The development was cancelled due to the size of the project. To date, Conflict remains as the only title in the series that was developed specifically for the PC and as the only PC game in the series developed solely by Team17 (the PC version of Alien Breed was ported by MicroLeague, while Alien Breed: Tower Assault were ported to the PC by East Point Software). According to what little information there is concerning this game, Conflict was also planned to be a first-person shooter and, presumably, would have followed on directly where The Killing Grounds left off.

References 

1996 video games
Alien Breed
Amiga games
Amiga 1200 games
Amiga-only games
Commercial video games with freely available source code
First-person shooters
Ocean Software games
Science fiction video games
Video game sequels
Video games developed in the United Kingdom
Multiplayer and single-player video games